Township High School District 113 is a school district in Illinois, with its headquarters in Highland Park. It is made up of two high schools and serves Highland Park, Deerfield, Highwood, Bannockburn, and Riverwoods.

It is governed by a 7-member school board. Dr. Bruce Law currently serves as the district's superintendent. The school board president is Jodi Shapira, the vice president is Ken Fishbain, and the secretary is Stacey Meyer. They serve alongside Gayle Byck, Elizabeth Garlovsky, Michael Pearlman, and Dan Struck.

Capital Improvements
April 2011 Referendum
In April 2011, the District 113 school board voted to approve a $133M ballot measure for capital improvements. The plan was defeated with 56.5% of voters voting against the plan.

April 2013 Referendum
After the defeat of the initial $133M plan, the District held open recruitment for community members to serve on "study groups" that would assist in evaluating the district's needs, and eventually, how to move forward. This culminated in the development of a Long-Range Master Plan, laying out a blueprint for the next several decades. The study groups were made up of a diverse group of community members from the district's feeder towns, and included both members of CARE for 113 (the "vote yes" committee) and Education 1st (the "vote no" committee). The groups presented their findings at a series of community meetings held in 2012. The ballot measure, a referendum for $89M in funds, was passed on April 9, 2013, election with 52.4% of voters approving.

The total cost of the new project is $114M - $25M will come from the district's existing capital improvements operating budget line item over five years, and the remaining $89M will come from a bond issue.

Schools
 Deerfield High School
 Highland Park High School

Feeder School Districts
Deerfield School District 109
North Shore School District 112

See also

 List of school districts in Illinois

References

External links
 Township High School District 113

School districts in Lake County, Illinois
Highland Park, Illinois
Highwood, Illinois
Deerfield, Illinois